Oleksiak or Oleksyak is a gender-neutral Slavic surname.
It may refer to

Agata Oleksiak (born 1978), Polish artist known professionally as Olek
Jamie Oleksiak (born 1992), Canadian ice hockey defenceman, brother of Olympic champion swimmer Penny Oleksiak
Jerry Oleksiak (born 1952), U.S. politician
Penny Oleksiak (born 2000), Canadian swimmer, sister of professional ice hockey player Jamie Oleksiak

See also

Slavic-language surnames
Surnames of Polish origin
Surnames of Ukrainian origin